Westrup is a surname. Notable people with the surname include,

 Brianna Westrup (born 1997), American footballer
 Caroline Westrup (born 1986), Norwegian-Swedish professional golfer
 Jack Westrup (1904–1975), English musicologist
 Kate Westrup (1885–1928), English artist